Pedicularis centranthera is a species of flowering plant in the family Orobanchaceae known by the common names dwarf lousewort and Great Basin lousewort. It is native to the western United States from eastern Oregon and California to Colorado and New Mexico, where it grows in sagebrush and other basin and plateau habitat. It is a perennial herb producing several short stems a few centimeters tall from a basal caudex. The leaves are up to 20 centimeters long, lance-shaped and divided into many overlapping toothed, wrinkled, or fringed lobes. The inflorescence is a short raceme bearing many long, protruding, club-shaped flowers. Each flower may exceed 4 centimeters in length and is white or pale purple with dark purple tips on the wide ends of its upper and lower lips. The sepals of the flowers are shorter and hairy. The fruit is a capsule around centimeter long containing seeds with netlike surfaces.

External links
 Calflora: Pedicularis centranthera
Jepson Manual Treatment
USDA Plants Profile
Southwest Colorado Wildflowers
Photo gallery

centranthera
Flora of the Western United States
Flora of California
Flora of the Colorado Plateau and Canyonlands region
Flora of the Great Basin
Taxa named by Asa Gray
Flora without expected TNC conservation status